Neider is a surname of German origin. 

Neider may refer to:

People
Andreas Neider (born 1958), German writer
Charles Neider (1915–2001), American writer
Linda L. Neider, American professor, scholar, educator and university administrator

Fictional Character
Auel Neider, a fictional character from Mobile Suit Gundam SEED DESTINY

Surnames of German origin